Edward Montagu (c. 1636 – 2 August 1665) was an English politician, courtier and naval officer. He was the MP for Sandwich, Kent.

Life
He was the eldest son of the second Baron Montagu. He was educated at Westminster School, matriculated at Christ Church, Oxford, on 5 June 1651, and was admitted at Sidney Sussex College, Cambridge, on 25 September 1651. He was created M.A. of Oxford on 9 September 1661.

In 1659, he joined his cousin, Admiral Montagu, with a view to influencing him in favour of the English Restoration, and was acting as a medium of communication between Charles II and the admiral in April 1660. He represented Sandwich in parliament from 1661 to 1665, and was master of the horse to Queen Catharine of Braganza.  He was commissioned captain-lieutenant of the King's company in the King's Foot Guards in February 1661.

He was killed at Bergen, Norway in August 1665, in the Battle of Vågen.

Notes

Attribution

1630s births
1665 deaths
17th-century Royal Navy personnel
Alumni of Christ Church, Oxford
Alumni of Sidney Sussex College, Cambridge
Eldest sons of British hereditary barons
English military personnel killed in action
English MPs 1661–1679
Heirs apparent who never acceded
Edward Montagu
People educated at Westminster School, London
Royal Navy personnel of the Anglo-Dutch Wars
Year of birth uncertain
Grenadier Guards officers